Yanelis Santos Allegne (born 30 March 1986, in Ciego de Ávila) is a volleyball player from Cuba, who represents the women's national team as a setter/opposite in the international team competition since 2002. Santos was named "Best Server" at the 2007 FIVB World Cup and the 2008 Summer Olympics.

Career
Santos started playing volleyball as a twelve year old in 1998, then joined the Senior national team in 2001.

Santos played with her national team at the 2008 Summer Olympics. Even though they had previously defeated  the US 3-0, this time they lost 0-3, falling to their nerves and own mistakes. They lost the bronze medal match  to China, 1-3. Santos was named the tournament's "Best Server".

Santos led the Cuban national team to the silver medal during the 2011 Montreux Volley Masters. She won with her national team the silver medal at the 2011 Pan American Games held in Guadalajara, Mexico. She also won the bronze medal and the Best Spiker award at the 2011 NORCECA Championship.

In the 2012 Pan-American Cup held in Ciudad Juarez, Mexico, she won the "Best Spiker" and "Best Server" awards, as well as the bronze medal with her national team.

Santos held the fastest female spike record, measured at 103 km/h (64 mph).

Santos was awarded 2012 Female Athlete of the Year in a team sport by the Institute of Sports, Physical Education and Recreation (INDER) and the Union of Cuban Journalists' Sports Writers Circle.

She signed with Voléro Zürich, moved to Switzerland and later was transferred on loan to the Russian club Leningradka Saint Petersburg for the 2014/15 season. She later signed for the Turkish İlbank Ankara for the 2015–16 season.

Awards

Individual
 2007 FIVB World Cup "Best Server"
 2007 Montreux Volley Masters "Best Server"
 2008 Final Four Cup "Best Server"
 2008 Summer Olympics "Best Server"
 2009 NORCECA Championship "Best Server"
 2011 NORCECA Championship "Best Spiker"
 2012 Summer Olympics NORCECA qualification tournament's "Best Server"
 2012 Pan-American Cup "Best Spiker"
 2012 Pan-American Cup "Best Server"

References

External links
 FIVB profile

1986 births
Living people
Cuban women's volleyball players
Volleyball players at the 2008 Summer Olympics
Olympic volleyball players of Cuba
Volleyball players at the 2003 Pan American Games
Volleyball players at the 2007 Pan American Games
Volleyball players at the 2011 Pan American Games
Pan American Games silver medalists for Cuba
Pan American Games gold medalists for Cuba
Pan American Games medalists in volleyball
Central American and Caribbean Games silver medalists for Cuba
Competitors at the 2006 Central American and Caribbean Games
Opposite hitters
Setters (volleyball)
Central American and Caribbean Games medalists in volleyball
Medalists at the 2011 Pan American Games
People from Ciego de Ávila
21st-century Cuban women
20th-century Cuban women